Girolamo Francesco Cristiani (3 August 1731 – 30 December 1811) was an Italian engineer and economist.

He was appreciated by Voltaire and inspired later studies about the Brenta river.

Works

References 

Italian economists
Italian engineers
1731 births
1811 deaths